The 2017–18 Virginia Tech Hokies men's basketball team represented Virginia Polytechnic Institute and State University during the 2017–18 NCAA Division I men's basketball season. The Hokies were led by fourth-year head coach Buzz Williams and played their home games at Cassell Coliseum in Blacksburg, Virginia as members of the Atlantic Coast Conference. They finished the season 21–12, 10–8 in ACC play to finish in seventh place. They lost in the second round of the ACC tournament to Notre Dame. They received an at-large bid to the NCAA tournament where they lost in the first round to Alabama.

Previous season
The Hokies finished the 2016–17 season 22–11, 10–8 in ACC play to finish in a tie for seventh place. They defeated Wake Forest in the second round of the ACC tournament before losing in the quarterfinals to Florida State. They received an invitation to the NCAA tournament as the #9 seed in the East region. There they lost to #8 Wisconsin in the first round.

Offseason

Departures

2017 recruiting class

Future recruits

2018 recruiting class

Roster

Schedule and results

|-
!colspan=12 style=|Exhibition

|-
!colspan=12 style=| Non-conference regular season

|-
!colspan=12 style=| ACC regular season

|-
!colspan=12 style=|ACC tournament

|-
!colspan=12 style=| NCAA tournament

Source

Rankings

*AP does not release post-NCAA Tournament rankings

References

Virginia Tech Hokies men's basketball seasons
Virginia Tech
Virginia Tech
Virginia Tech
Virginia Tech